Nicolás Jofre (born 16 October 1984) is a Chilean handball player for Santiago Steel and the Chilean national team.

References

1984 births
Living people
Chilean male handball players
Handball players at the 2003 Pan American Games
Handball players at the 2007 Pan American Games
Handball players at the 2011 Pan American Games
Handball players at the 2015 Pan American Games
Pan American Games bronze medalists for Chile
Pan American Games medalists in handball
Medalists at the 2015 Pan American Games
Medalists at the 2011 Pan American Games
21st-century Chilean people
20th-century Chilean people